Syed Rumman Bin Wali Sabbir, is a Bangladeshi former footballer. He played for Mohammedan Sporting Club (MSC) in the Dhaka domestic league during the 1980s and 1990s. He made several appearances for the Bangladesh national football team, appearning in the 1990 FIFA World Cup qualifying rounds. He is commonly regarded as the "Maradona of Bangladesh".

Success with Mohammedan

Sabbir joined Mohammedan in 1987. And he played a key role in MSC winning the double, the Federation Cup plus the Dhaka league title. In the Federation Cup final they defeated their great rival of the 1950s, Dhaka Wanderers 1–0. In the league the MSC side trailed Abahani for most of season, but following an impressive 3–2 victory for MSC   in the final match of the regular season, the two teams were tied at the top. The 1st replay saw a 0–0 draw but Mohammedan clinched the title after a 2–0 victory in the 2nd replay.

He has also represented Mohammedan at the 1988–89 and 1989–90 seasons of the Asian Club Championship.

For the national team
In the national team Sabbir formed a partnership with the Abahani striker Sheikh Mohammad Aslam, and the two combined to produce many important goals for the national side. For example, a cross by Sabbir helped Aslam score a headed goal against Iran, at Dhaka, in a FIFA World Cup qualifier in early 1989. Bangladesh lost 2–1. The missed penalty by Sabbir in the first half proved decisive. The team was more successful in the President's Cup final later that year. There, Aslam scored, heading a Sabbir corner to give Bangladesh the lead against a South Korea side; and although the visitors equalized, Bangladesh prevailed in the penalty shootout.

Sabbir scored his last goal for the national team against Thailand on 5 May 1993, but Bangladesh lost 1–4. He played a total of twenty matches for the national team and appeared in his last match at the Al Maktoum Stadium in UAE, against Sri Lanka on 7 May 1993.

In Calcutta league
In the summer of 1991, Sabbir was invited to play for Kolkata Mohammedan in the Calcutta Football League, and appeared with the side for a season.

In domestic league
Before joining Mohammedan, Sabbir began his professional career at Sheikh Jamal Dhanmondi Club. He appeared with Dhanmondi from 1985 to 1987. At his peak, Sabbir was regarded as one of the country's finest winger. After his second stint with Dhaka Mohammedan, he signed with Rahmatganj MFS in 1997. Although his career was interrupted by injury, he left a lasting impression on the domestic game.

Career statistics

International

International goal

Post-playing career
In May 2021, Sabbir became a member of the technical committee for cricket and football of the Dhaka Mohammedan.

Honours

Bangladesh
 South Asian Games Silver medal: 1989

References

External links
 http://bdnews24.com/sport/2005/04/07/bff-to-honour-10-legendary-footballers
 
 page at Facebook.com

Bangladeshi footballers
Bangladesh international footballers
Living people
Footballers at the 1990 Asian Games
Association football wingers
Asian Games competitors for Bangladesh
Mohammedan SC (Kolkata) players
Mohammedan SC (Dhaka) players
Sheikh Jamal Dhanmondi Club players
Bangladeshi expatriate footballers
Bangladeshi expatriate sportspeople in India
Expatriate footballers in India
Calcutta Football League players
People from Kabirhat Upazila
1972 births
Rahmatganj MFS players
South Asian Games medalists in football
South Asian Games silver medalists for Bangladesh